Combustion Science and Technology is a monthly peer-reviewed scientific journal covering research on combustion. The editor-in-chief is Richard A. Yetter (Pennsylvania State University). It is published by Taylor & Francis and was established in 1969. The journal was preceded by Pyrotechnics, which was published from 1964-1969.

Abstracting and indexing
The journal is abstracted and indexed in,

According to the Journal Citation Reports, the journal has a 2020 impact factor of 2.174.

See also

References

External links

Taylor & Francis academic journals
Chemistry journals
Physics journals
English-language journals
Engineering journals
Combustion
Publications established in 1969
Monthly journals